Typhoon Olga, also known in the Philippines as Typhoon Ising, was a typhoon that hit Korean Peninsula in 1999. Olga killed 106 people in North and South Korea and caused US$657 million in damages.

Meteorological history 

On July 26, a disturbance began to develop at the eastern end of a well-defined monsoon trough well to the east of the Philippines. The convection within the disturbance increased as it moved to the north and Tropical Depression 11W formed on July 29. The system continued to intensify, becoming Typhoon Olga two days later as it approached Okinawa. On August 1 Olga made landfall on the Japanese island as a typhoon, weakening slightly as it passed over the island. As it moved to the north-northwest it intensified to its peak with  winds as it approached Korea. The storm was beginning to weaken as it passed to the west of Cheju Island on August 3 and it made a second brief landfall on the T'aean Peninsula before moving north in the Yellow Sea. The storm made its final landfall in North Korea as a strong tropical storm later that day with  winds and became extratropical soon after. Both the JMA and PAGASA considered Olga a typhoon, with PAGASA naming the storm Ising before the JTWC issued its first warning on the developing system.

Impact 
Although Typhoon Olga never approached the Philippines closely, it was responsible for heavy rains over much of Luzon that displaced 80,000 and killed 160 people, 60 of which coming from a landslide that occurred in Antipolo, a suburban city outside Metro Manila. Olga passed over Okinawa, with winds of  recorded at Kadena Air Base, causing minimal damage. Torrential rain of up to  fell on the Korean Peninsula, with the highest totals falling near the border between North and South Korea. The Red Cross reported a further 42 deaths and 40,000 were made homeless from flooding in North Korea. That same flooding worsened the ongoing food shortages across the country. Typhoon Olga brought the heaviest rains recorded in Korea for 25 years and caused a total of $657 million of damage in South Korea.

See also 
 1999 Pacific typhoon season
 Typhoon Haikui (2012) – another typhoon which indirectly affected the Philippines by enhancing the monsoon and caused widespread flooding.

References 

Typhoons in South Korea
1999 in South Korea
1999 in North Korea
Typhoons in North Korea
1999 Pacific typhoon season